Katie Elizabeth Britt (née Boyd; born February 2, 1982) is an American politician, businesswoman, and attorney serving as the junior United States senator from Alabama since 2023. A member of the Republican Party, Britt is the first woman to be elected to the U.S. Senate from Alabama and the youngest Republican woman ever elected to the Senate. She served as president and CEO of the Business Council of Alabama from 2019 to 2021 and as chief of staff for her Senate predecessor, Richard Shelby, from 2016 to 2018.

Early life and education
Britt was born as Katie Elizabeth Boyd to Julian and Debra Boyd on February 2, 1982, in the city of Enterprise. She was raised outside Fort Rucker in Dale County, Alabama, and worked at her family's small business throughout her youth. In her youth, she was an attendee of the Girls' State leadership program, and was elected to a governor position at the conference in 1999. A graduate of Enterprise High School, Britt was a cheerleader there and one of 19 valedictorians upon graduation in 2000. She enrolled at the University of Alabama, where she majored in political science and was elected president of its Student Government Association. She graduated in 2004 with a Bachelor of Science degree. In 2013, she received a Juris Doctor from the University of Alabama School of Law.

Law and business career 
After she graduated from the University of Alabama, Britt joined the staff of U.S. Senator Richard Shelby in May 2004 as deputy press secretary. She was later promoted to press secretary. In 2007, she left Shelby's staff and worked as a special assistant to University of Alabama president Robert Witt. At the University of Alabama School of Law, she participated in Tax Moot Court.

After law school, Britt first worked at Johnston Barton Proctor & Rose LLP in Birmingham. When the firm shut down in March 2014, Britt and 17 other former employees joined the Birmingham office of Butler Snow LLP. She founded the firm's government affairs branch. In November 2015, Britt took a leave of absence from Butler Snow to return to Shelby's staff, working on his reelection campaign as deputy campaign manager and communications director.

In 2016, Shelby named Britt his chief of staff. She became a top advisor to Shelby and head of his Judicial Nomination Task Force. In May 2016, Yellowhammer News named Britt one of "the people who will be running Alabama in a few years".

In December 2018, Britt was selected as president and CEO of the Business Council of Alabama, effective January 2; she was the first woman to lead the organization. As head of what Alabama Daily News called one of the state's "most influential political organizations", she focused on workforce and economic development through tax incentives, and addressed the state's prison system and participation in the 2020 United States census. During the COVID-19 pandemic in 2020, Britt led a "Keep Alabama Open" effort to self-govern business affairs by avoiding shutdowns and maintain employment. In April 2021, she was elected to the Alabama Wildlife Federation's board of directors. Britt resigned from her positions at the Business Council of Alabama in June 2021, amid media speculation that she would run for the U.S. Senate.

U.S. Senate

Elections

2022

On June 8, 2021, Britt announced her candidacy in the Republican primary for the 2022 Senate election in Alabama. Britt, who had never previously run for public office, started out the race polling at 2%, but gradually climbed in the polls as the race went on. 

As a Senate candidate, Britt publicly aligned herself with former President Donald Trump. Although Britt gave credence to Trump's false claims of fraud in the 2020 presidential election, she has never outright claimed the election was "stolen". She advanced to a runoff in the Republican primary against Representative Mo Brooks. Trump officially endorsed Britt on June 10, 2022, calling her a "fearless America First warrior". He had previously withdrawn an endorsement of Brooks. Britt defeated Brooks in the runoff on June 21, 2022, with 63% of the vote. She then handily won the general election on November 8. 

After winning the election, Britt became the first woman elected a U.S. senator from Alabama (previous female U.S. senators from Alabama had been appointed to the position). She was also the youngest Republican woman elected U.S. senator and the second-youngest woman overall (Democrat Blanche Lincoln being the youngest).

Tenure
Britt took office on January 3, 2023. Following leadership elections for the 118th United States Congress, she did not say whether she supported Mitch McConnell or Rick Scott for Senate Minority Leader. Before taking office, Britt was selected as the only incoming senator to serve on the newly formed Republican Party Advisory Council of the Republican National Committee.

In February 2023, CoinDesk reported that Britt was one of three members of Alabama's congressional delegation who received money from FTX, the defunct cryptocurrency exchange, alongside Robert Aderholt and Gary Palmer. Britt's office responded to an inquiry from CoinDesk by stating that the money had been donated back.

Committee assignments
 Committee on Appropriations
 Subcommittee on Commerce, Justice, Science, and Related Agencies
 Subcommittee on Interior, Environment, and Related Agencies
 Subcommittee on Homeland Security
 Subcommittee on Energy and Water Development
 Subcommittee on Labor, Health and Human Services, Education, and Related Agencies
 Committee on Banking, Housing, and Urban Affairs
 Subcommittee on Housing, Transportation and Community Development
 Subcommittee on National Security and International Trade and Finance
 Committee on Rules and Administration

Caucuses
 Senate Republican Conference

Political positions

Britt holds conservative views.

Abortion
Britt describes herself as pro-life. Her first television advertisement in the 2022 U.S. Senate election highlighted her position on abortion, stating that life begins at conception and comparing late-term abortions to murder. In May 2022, shortly before the first round of the Republican primary, opposing candidate Michael Durant attacked Britt's position on abortion, citing a resolution the Student Senate passed while she was serving as president of the University of Alabama Student Government Association. The resolution called for morning-after pills to be stocked at the university health center's pharmacy, which was already prescribing the pills at the time. Britt's campaign responded that she never supported or voted on the resolution, and that she was unable to veto it due to her position's restrictions. The Alabama Political Reporter found these statements to be accurate based on The Crimson White articles from the time of Britt's presidency. Britt's campaign added that she would "defend the sacred right to life" as senator.

Education
In July 2021, Britt supported a motion from Alabama Governor Kay Ivey to ban the teaching of critical race theory in public schools. She has been called a "vocal proponent" of school choice by Yellowhammer News.

Foreign policy
Britt is a critic of the Chinese Communist Party. In August 2022, she charged the Biden administration with inaction and "total weakness" in regard to China, highlighting humanitarian crises in China, as well as its dominance in manufacturing, saying that China was "taking jobs". In September 2022, she accused the social media platform TikTok of being a "Trojan horse" for the Chinese Communist Party; other American lawmakers have expressed similar concern about TikTok as a potential security threat. In October 2022, Britt pledged to co-sponsor a bill introduced by Senators Tommy Tuberville and Tom Cotton to keep Chinese-owned companies from purchasing American farmland.

Gun rights
Following the passing of the Protecting Our Kids Act in June 2022, Britt told 1819 News that she believes red flag laws are a "gateway to push [a] disarming agenda". She opposes gun laws that she says infringe on the Second Amendment. She has called the Second Amendment "a critical check against the timeless tyranny of government".

Healthcare
In August 2021, Britt wrote a column calling for an open discussion and prioritization of mental health. Her column also expressed her wish to combat the opioid epidemic and suicide rates in the United States. In May 2022, Britt called "affordable access to quality mental health care and resources" a "major component" of her Senate campaign's platform. She supports efforts to eliminate the stigmatization of mental illness.

Immigration
Britt supports reducing legal immigration "to a sensible level" and prioritizing skills and merit over family associations. She has said she will introduce legislation to prevent birthright citizenship from applying to children whose parents entered the country illegally. She also supports and has pledged to sponsor the RAISE Act, first introduced by Senator Tom Cotton in 2017.

Technology
Following her election to the U.S. Senate, Britt named expansion of broadband access as one of her areas of focus. After the release of the Twitter Files in December 2022, Britt joined Alabama representatives Jerry Carl and Barry Moore in calling for reform to Section 230, specifically criticizing Big Tech and saying that she was looking forward to congressional hearings "getting to the bottom of what occurred at Twitter in 2020".

Personal life
Katie Britt is married to Wesley Britt, a former NFL player. They met while attending the University of Alabama, and married on March 8, 2008. They reside in Montgomery, Alabama, and have two children. The Britts attend First United Methodist Church in Montgomery.

Electoral history

References

External links
 Katie Britt official U.S. Senate website
 Katie Britt for Senate campaign website
 
 
 

|-

|-

|-

1982 births
21st-century American businesspeople
21st-century American businesswomen
21st-century American lawyers
21st-century American women lawyers
21st-century American politicians
21st-century American women politicians
American chief executives
American press secretaries
American Methodists
American United Methodists
American women chief executives
Alabama Republicans
Businesspeople from Alabama
Female United States senators
Lawyers from Montgomery, Alabama
Living people
Methodists from Alabama
People from Enterprise, Alabama
Political chiefs of staff
Republican Party United States senators from Alabama
United States congressional aides
University of Alabama alumni
University of Alabama School of Law alumni
Women in Alabama politics